Serbia 21 (S21) is a political organization in Serbia. It was founded in early 2020 by former members of the Social Democratic Party (SDS) and Democratic Party (DS).

History
Marko Đurišić and Nenad Konstantinović were previously a part of the Social Democratic Party (SDS) but after the party stated that they will boycott the upcoming elections they decided to create a new political organization which will participate in the next elections and which will also focus on the Serbian accession to the European Union. After some time they were also supported by Gordana Čomić of the Democratic Party (DS). The party participated in the 2020 parliamentary election, and they stated multiple times that "it is only possible to change the system and to remove Vučić from power if we participate in the elections". Boris Tadić, the president of the Social Democratic Party, has classified the organization as "Vučić's project". By the time of the election, the organization had two MPs and a joint parliamentary group with Vojvodina Front. 

They were also a part of the United Democratic Serbia (UDS) coalition, together with Party of Modern Serbia (SMS), League of Social Democrats of Vojvodina (LSV)-led Vojvodina Front and the Civic Democratic Forum (GDF). The organization has remained inactive since the 2020 parliamentary election.

Electoral results

Parliamentary elections

References

Political parties established in 2020
Pro-European political parties in Serbia
Social liberal parties
Centrist parties in Serbia
Centre-left parties in Europe